The Pune International Marathon is an annual marathon foot-race held in Pune, India. The first edition of the race was held in 1983, and the 36th edition will be held in December 2022. It attracts many international participants, who compete with local and national runners in the distinct climate of the Indian subcontinent. It hosted the Asian Marathon Championship race in 2010.

The event also organizes a short celebrity run in which film personalities and national athletes participate and raise money for charitable causes.

In its 21st edition, held in 2006, the event attracted over 50,000 runners from India and around the world. Corporate participants also helped in the  battle against HIV/AIDS by participating in the 4.5 km charity race. All the money collected from this race was donated to Project Concern International, an NGO working towards HIV/AIDS awareness and prevention in Pune.

The twenty-fifth edition of the event was held in 2010. The organizers introduced two new categories - Women's Full Marathon and Men's Half Marathon.

Since 1983, thousands of runners from all walks of life have taken part in the event. The Pune International Marathon is now widely used as a platform to spread social messages and raise funds for charitable causes. The Athletics Federation of India has awarded the status of 'National Marathon Championship' to the Pune International Marathon. The marathon route consists of Pune's scenic and historic locations with thousands of spectators lining up along the course to cheer the participants. It is the most anticipated running festival in the city of Pune.

Race day photos 
In the 33rd edition of the race held on 2 December 2018, participants could easily find their candid action photos directly on the basis of their names or Bib numbers. Pune International Marathon partnered with SplitSecondPix, a Technology company based out of Mumbai to enable this facility for the participants. This facility created lot of excitement amongst runners and welcomed the new introduction with cheer and joy.

Race Types

Past winners

Key:

References

List of winners
Krishnan, Ram Murali et al. (2010-12-14). Pune Marathon. Association of Road Racing Statisticians. Retrieved on 2011-10-23.

External links
 Running Races in India
20th edition of the Pune International Marathon, sponsored by Hutch Technologies
 29th edition of the Pune International Marathon

Marathons in India
Recurring sporting events established in 1983
Sports competitions in Pune
1983 establishments in Maharashtra

ta:புனே பன்னாட்டு மாரத்தான்